Manhattan Beach was a former amusement park in Denver, USA, (1881–1914). It was built near Denver on the shore of Sloan's Lake in Edgewater, Colorado, and was the first amusement park created west of the Mississippi River. Open to the public for the first time on 27 June 1881, it had a roller coaster, a dance hall, a Ferris wheel, boating attractions, hot air balloon rides, wrestling bears, contortionists, aerial acts (including a human cannonball), a man who walked on ceilings, and exhibits displaying more than 40 species of animals, but its primary draw was Roger the Elephant (real name: Rajah), who was a popular children's ride. Visitors reached the park by streetcar, boats, and wagons.

A large theater at the park was opened on June 27, 1891. It featured everything from light opera to vaudeville.

While Manhattan Beach was a popular destination, competition (from nearby Elitch Gardens and White City, the latter eventually becoming Lakeside Amusement Park) and mishaps marked its existence. Roger the Elephant was spooked by the sound of a hot-air balloon, bucked passengers and stepped on the head of a six-year-old boy; George W. Eaton (son of Pressley Jr. and Harriett Eaton, brother of Clayton Arnold "Jack"  Eaton). In 1908, Manhattan Beach was damaged by fire; later that year, it was rebuilt and reopened as Luna Park. It closed for the final time in 1914.

References

Defunct amusement parks in the United States
1881 establishments in Colorado
1914 disestablishments in Colorado
Geography of Denver